William Redman may refer to:
 William Redman (bishop), English bishop
 William Redman (politician), Australian politician
 Billy Redman, English footballer